William Egerton (originally William Tatton; 1749–1806) was an English politician and a member of the Egerton family.

Egerton was the son of William Tatton and Hester, sister of Samuel Egerton, who was her brother's heiress. He changed his surname to his mother's on 9 July 1780.

Egerton represented as Member of Parliament the constituencies of Hindon, Newcastle-under-Lyme and Cheshire.

Family
Egerton married four times. By his second marriage, to Mary daughter of Richard Wilbraham Bootle, he had three sons and one daughter. The second son of this marriage was Wilbraham Egerton.

Notes

|-

1749 births
1806 deaths
British MPs 1784–1790
British MPs 1790–1796
British MPs 1796–1800
High Sheriffs of Cheshire
Members of the Parliament of Great Britain for Newcastle-under-Lyme
Members of the Parliament of the United Kingdom for Newcastle-under-Lyme
UK MPs 1801–1802
UK MPs 1802–1806
Tatton family
Egerton family